Shine is the tenth album by jazz saxophonist Boney James, released in 2006, and his first for Concord Records.

Track listing

Personnel 
 Boney James – arrangements (1-11), keyboards (1, 3, 4, 6, 7, 10, 12), tenor saxophone (2, 3, 5, 6, 9, 10), horn arrangements (2), soprano saxophone (3, 8, 11, 12), alto saxophone (4, 6, 7), flute (7)
 Darrell Smith – keyboards (1, 3, 8), acoustic piano (3), Rhodes piano (8), Wurlitzer electric piano (9)
 Eric Daniels – acoustic piano (8)
 Johnny Britt – acoustic piano (2), arrangements (2)
 George Duke – Rhodes piano (2)
 Rex Rideout – acoustic piano (4), Rhodes piano (4), keyboards (4)
 Tim Carmon – keyboards (5, 7, 10), arrangements (5), Rhodes piano (6, 11), organ (6), acoustic piano (7, 9)
 Gerald McCauley – Moog synthesizer (11), arrangements (11)
 Herman Jackson – Rhodes piano (12)
 Paul Jackson Jr. – guitars (1), acoustic guitar (2)
 Tony Maiden – electric guitar (2, 10, 11), guitars (7)
 Kleber Jorge – acoustic guitar (3), vocals (3)
 Michael Thompson – guitars (4)
 Agape – guitars (5)
 Dean Parks – guitars (6), acoustic guitar (10, 11)
 Wah Wah Watson – guitars (7), rhythm guitar (9)
 George Benson – lead guitar (9)
 Alex Al – bass (2-4, 6-9, 11)
 Teddy Campbell – drums (1)
 Lil' John Roberts – drums (2-4, 6-11)
 Lenny Castro – percussion (2-4, 6-12)
 Dan Higgins – saxophones (2, 9), flute (9)
 Bill Reichenbach Jr. – trombone (2, 9)
 Jerry Hey – trumpet (2), flugelhorn (2, 9), horn arrangements (2)
 Christian Scott – trumpet (10)
 Tollak Ollestad – harmonica (11)
 Romeo – vocal arrangements (5)
 Esthero – lead and backing vocals (1)
 Lauren Evans – backing vocals (1, 11), ooh vocals (5)
 Dwele – vocals (5), vocal arrangements (5)
 Faith Evans – vocals (6)
 Philip Bailey – vocals (8)
 Ann Nesby – vocals (12)

String section (Tracks 2, 8, 9 & 11)
 Boney James – arrangements
 Jerry Hey – arrangements
 Darrell Smith – arrangements (8, 11)
 Stephen Erdody, Trevor Handy, Paula Hochhalter and Tina Soule – cello 
 Sam Formicola, Carrie Holzman-Little, Roland Kato and Victoria Miskolczy – viola 
 Jackie Brand, Bruce Dukov, Julie Gigante, Henry Gronnier, Alan Grunfeld, Natalie Leggett, Ralph Morrison, Alyssa Park, Katia Popov, Tereza Stanislav, Sarah Thornblade and Margaret Wooten – violin

Production 
 Boney James – producer, recording
 Todd Fairall – recording 
 Darius Fong – recording, second engineer 
 Dave Rideau – recording 
 Bill Schnee – recording, mixing (2, 3, 4, 7-12)
 Michael Thompson – recording 
 John Adams – second engineer 
 Jeff Harris – second engineer 
 Jimmy Hoyson – second engineer 
 Ryan Kennedy – second engineer 
 Mark McLaughlin – second engineer 
 Philip Ramos – second engineer 
 Eric Rennaker – second engineer 
 Assen Stoyanov – second engineer 
 Erich Talaba – second engineer 
 Aaron Walk – second engineer 
 John Wroble – second engineer 
 Koji Egawa – Pro Tools consultant
 Serban Ghenea – mixing (1, 5, 6)
 Robert Hadley – mastering 
 Lexy Shroyer – production coordinator 
 Glenn Barry – art production 
 Andy Engel – design 
 Don Miller – photography 
 Direct Management Group, Inc. – management 

Studios
 Recorded at The Backyard, Record Plant and Westlake Studios (Los Angeles, California); Capitol Studios and Sunset Sound (Hollywood, California); Schnee Studios (North Hollywood, California); Cocoa Butt Studios (Culver City, California); Porcupine Studios (Chandler, Arizona); Studio A (Dearborn Heights, Michigan).
 Mixed at MixStar Studios (Virginia Beach, Virginia) and Schnee Studios (North Hollywood, California).
 Mastered at The Mastering Lab (Hollywood, California).

References

2006 albums
Boney James albums
Concord Records albums